Big Stone is an unincorporated community in southern Alberta in Special Area No. 3, located  south of Highway 9,  northwest of Medicine Hat.

The community takes its name from nearby Bigstone Creek.

Climate 
Big Stone experiences a semi-arid climate (Köppen climate classification BSk) with long, cold, dry winters and short, warm summers.

References 

Localities in Special Area No. 3